Seyyed Mohammad Fazlhashemi was born in Tehran/Iran in 1961. He has been living in Sweden since 1977. He is a professor of Islamic Theology and Philosophy at Uppsala University, Sweden.

Publications
 Förändring och kontinuitet, Al-Ghazâlîs politiska omsvängning, Umeå, 1994.
 "Muslimsk exil och den europeiska medborgarskapsdiskursen, iranska intellektuella i London och Paris 1850-1908", Medborgarskap, Reflektioner kring ett problematiskt europeiskt begrepp, ed. Fazlhashemi, Mohammad & Fruitman, Stephen, Stockholm, 1997.
 "Turkey: Iran's Window on Europe", Boundaries of Europe?, FRN rapport nr 98:6, Stockholm, 1998.
 Exemplets makt, Föreställningar om Europa/Väst i Iran 1850-1980, Stockholm, 1999.
 Vidgade vyer, Globalt perspektiv på idéhistoria, ed. Fazlhashemi, Öckerman & Ambjörnsson, Lund, 2000.
 Occidentalism: idéer om väst och modernitet bland muslimska tänkare, Lund, 2005.
 Vems islam. De kontrastrika muslimerna, Stockholm, 2008, 2009, 2012.
 Omodernt : människor och tankar i förmodern tid / (ed.) Mohammad Fazlhashemi & Eva Österberg, Lund, 2009.
 Tro eller förnuft i politisk islam, Stockholm, 2011.
 "Den arabiska våren. Folkets uppror i Mellanöstern och Nordafrika", Lund, 2013, 2014.
 "Vems islam. De kontrastrika muslimerna", Lund, 2014.
 "Islams dynamiska mellantid. Muslimsk idéhistoria mellan guldåldern och framväxten av politisk islam", Stockholm 2016.
 "Visdomens hus. Muslimska idévärldar 600 – 2000", Stockholm 2017. (In cooperation with Professor Ronny Ambjörnsson)
 "The Parallel Power System as an Alternative to Revolution and Passivity"", Future(s) of the Revolution and the Reformation / [ed] Elena Namli, Switzerland: Palgrave Macmillan, 2019.
 Systematiska studier av kristen och muslimsk tro - en introduktion, [eds.] Mohammad Fazlhashemi & Mattias Martinson, Malmö 2021.
 "Internal Critique in Muslim Context", A Constructive Critique of Religion: Encounterns between Christianity, Islam, and non-religion in Secular Societies / [ed] Mia Lövheim & Mikael Stenmark, London: Bloomsbury Academic, 2020.
 "A Book for Children, Manual in Court Intrigues or Advice for Ethical Government: Appelboom’s Swedish Translation of Kalila and Dimna", Turcologica Upsaliensia: An Illustrated Collection of Essays / [ed] Éva Á. Csató, Gunilla Gren-Eklund, Lars Johanson, Birsel Karakoç, Leiden: Brill Academic Publishers, 2020.
 "Imāmiyya Shīʿa (The Twelvers)", Handbook of Islamic Sects and Movements / [ed] Muhammad Afzal Upal & Carole M. Cusack, Leiden Boston: Brill Academic Publishers, 2021.
 Shiʿite Salafism?, Palgrave Series in Islamic Theology, Law, and History. Palgrave Macmillan, 2022.

References

External links
 Umeå universitet - Mohammad Fazlhashemi
 Internationella biblioteket, Interview with Mohammad Fazlhashemi

1961 births
Living people
Iranian emigrants to Sweden
Iranian expatriate academics
Swedish male writers
20th-century Swedish historians
Academic staff of Uppsala University
21st-century Swedish historians